Chaung-U is a town located in Monywa District, Sagaing Region, Myanmar. It is the principal town of Chaung-U Township. In the Bagan Dynasty, when King Popa Saw Rahan (also known as King Taungthugyi) governed the country, it was named "San Tauk Village". It was a large village where different natives of the Union of Myanmar, like Kayin, Shan and Lawah (Wah) natives, lived happily together. Then, King Kyansit founded the city, gathering ten villages together, for example, Ywa Thit and Ywa Ma, naming it Chaung-U (or Chaung Oo). The Monywa–Mandalay highway road passes it, so the communication to it is good, quick and easy. The Monywa–Mandalay railway meets that of Chaung-U–Pakokku in the town's station, so it is possible to get there by train. Its official township boundary touches the boundaries of other townships: Myinmu is in the east, Myaung is in the south and south-east, Salingyi is in the west, and Monywa is in the north. The Chindwin River is in the west of the township and the town is six miles away from the river. In Chaung-U there are historical ancient pagodas. Besides, its township has other historical villages, streams, and hills.

History
It was a village in the early age of the Bagan Dynasties before King Anawrahta. To be exact, it was a crowded village, so King Taung Thu Kyi transferred there from Poppa when he was a farmer before he became a king. When he became the King in Bagan, he founded the village as an ideal village surrounded by ten villages, and he called it Than Tauk in ME 187. The village was named Than Tauk (San Tauk) because holes flared up when some holes were dug to traditionally bury the abracadabra copper sheets in the ground and to make the village fence. Then, King Kyansit founded the city with ten villages including San Tauk and named it Chaung-U. He called it so because some waves of the Nwe Chway stream were ahead of him there, although he tried to jump across it. When he was a prince, he had always been there and he stayed for a while. After that, the prince Kya Swar and his mother stayed and prayed in Saman Daja (Thaman Daza) Pagoda in Chaung-U to become a king. When he became the King, he offered to gild the pagoda. There is still an inscription on flat stone for his gilding and offering to the pagoda and donating to the monastery.

There are many historical ancient pagodas and monasteries in Chaung-U. It has over 200 pagodas and 60 monasteries. Among them, the most distinctive pagoda is Yadana Shwe Gukyi Pagoda built in the downtown in ME 288. Some people say that it was built by King Ah'laung Sithu and some people say that King Popa Saw Raham built it. Throughout all dynasties in Myanmar, Chaung-U has been a town but it was sometimes a village. When King Sin Phyu Shin governed in Innwa and the country, Ramma Siri Kyaw Htin, the Librarian of Pitakkat and headman of ten villages of Chaung-U, was a famous doctor of literature. Moreover, Min Latwah who served King Mindom was also a famous headman of ten villages of Chaung-U and mayor of A Myint. In the age of the British Colony, Venerable Abbot Ven. D Pa of Maha Dhmmayone Pali University was honored as the Agga Maha Pantita by the British Government of Myanmar. Later abbots were also granted that certificate of honour by the National Governments. In ME 1365 or 2004, the centenary ceremony of the university was celebrated. Many famous poets, politicians and intellectuals have been born in Chaung-U. Now, it is a crowded town located on important highways.

Directory
The Monywa–Mandalay and Chaung-U-Pakokku trains provide access to Chaung-U. It is possible to reach from Mandalay or Monywa, and from Pakokku by car, bike, motor bike or by other vehicles. It is 84 miles away from Mandalay, and 14 miles away from Monywa. Moreover, there is a good highway from Chaung-U to Pakokku. Chindwin river is in the west.

Economy 
Since there is much farmland all over the township and the town is located at the junction of two highway roads, public business goes quite well and it is abundantly rich with vegetables, fruits and other foods. One can abundantly and cheaply get any sort of vegetables. The communication is so easy, thus the commerce or trade and transportation are good enough to say that a high percentage of population in the town have got enough good business and a comfortable living standard.

Weather and climate
It is in a central zone of Myanmar. Its weather is fair. Chaung-U features a tropical wet and dry climate.

Geography
In the east of the town, there are long rocky hills, namely, "Nwechway Hills". The town is situated in a plain. In the west, there have many green basin farms near the Chindwin river. Those farms in the east are irrigated by Nwe Chway Dam near Nwe Chway village.

Education
Technical High School (THS)/Institute of Technical and Vocational High Education

Places of attractions
Hsinbyushin Bridge
Shwe Gu Gyi Pagoda
Nwe Chway Dam
Maha Dhmmayon Pali University and Ya-Pyei Temple

Distinction
Chaung-U is a town that was not totally destroyed by the World Wars. It had one of the earliest National Institutes during the British colonial period. Thakin Kodaw Hmaing, a poet and politician, wrote about the town in "Ten Villages of Chaung-U". Venerable Bago Myoma Shweku, abbot Ven. Eindasara, Venerable Mandalay Myoma Masoyein, abbot Ven. Siri Nanda Vivamsa (Thiri Nanda Bhiwuntha), Venerable Monywa Thaton Vamsa (Thaton Wuntha), and abbot Ven. Pannavamsa (Pyinnyawuntha) learnt their Pari Yatti Buddhist literature in the Maha Dhmmayon Pali University in Chaung-U. Moreover, the abbot of Maha Bodhi Tahtaung, Ven U Narada also learnt the Buddhist literature in Kyigon in Chaung-U township.

Another distinction of the town is having the oldest festival of the whole township, Maha Pawah Rāna, on Thadingyut Full Moon Day every year. In 2012, the 70th Maha Pawah Rāna Festival of the whole township was celebrated. In the festival, all Buddhist monks in the whole township meet each other and make the Pawah Rāna in the only Buddhist Pawah Rāna Hall of the township, and Buddhist people offer some articles to them in every Thadingyut Full Moon Day. The festival has been successfully celebrated yearly since 1942. As the 70th festival of Maha Pawah Rāna was recently celebrated last Thadingyut Full Moon Day in 2012, Chaung-U is one of the towns and cities having the longest Maha Pawah Rāna festival tradition.

Notable people
 Pitika Librarian Ramma Siri Kyaw Htin who served at the court of King Hsinbyushin
 Min Letwa, the Mayor of Amyint and headman of ten villages of Chaung-U, who served King Mindom
 Venerable Abbot Ven. D Pa of Maha Dhmmayon Pali University 
 U Wisara (Ven. Vicara), a national hero and martyr of the nation of Myanmar, who was also one of the prominent activists against British rule in Burma and born in Kannyeint village in Chaung-U Township
 Nyo Mya who wrote the article Hell Hound at Large in Oway magazine (born in Thawtapan village in the township) (See also A Myint Village)
 Maung Gyi, Ledi Pantita, born in Nyaung Phyu Pin village (before, Chaung-U Township; now Monywa Township)

Transport
It is served by a station on the Myanmar Railways.
Can Take high-way bus directly to Yangon, Mandalay and Monywa.

See also
 Transport in Myanmar

References

Township capitals of Myanmar